Emilie Nautnes (born 13 January 1999) is a Norwegian footballer who plays for LSK Kvinner FK and the Norway women's national football team. She was selected to the team representing Norway at the 2019 FIFA Women's World Cup.

Career statistics

References

External links
 

1999 births
Living people
People from Aukra
Norwegian women's footballers
Norway women's youth international footballers
Norway women's international footballers
Women's association football forwards
Toppserien players
Arna-Bjørnar players
2019 FIFA Women's World Cup players
Sportspeople from Møre og Romsdal